Iulian Tameș (born 6 December 1978) is a Romanian football coach and a former player who played as a central offensive midfielder. He is an assistant coach of Unirea Bascov. In his career, Tameș also played for important teams such as Dinamo București, FC Argeș Pitești, Politehnica Timișoara or FC Brașov, among others.

Club career

Early career
Tameș started his career at Dinamo București where he played for seven years. He was a very important man for Dinamo in these years, scoring 10 goals and adding over 40 assists in 115 matches. In this period, he won two titles with Dinamo. He was loaned out to Rocar where scored three goals in 14 appearances. Tameș was loaned out again, this time at Aro making 31 appearances and scoring 6 goals.

In 2005, he signed with Alania, where play just three matches because he was not settled in Russian Championship. He returned to Romania this time at Național București where he impressed and after few months signed again with Dinamo.

Tameș returned to Dinamo and won another Championship playing 15 matches and adding 7 assists. In the summer signed with Argeș Pitești helping the team to a promotion in Liga I. Tameș played 91 matches and scored 31 goals, best form in his career, becoming a legend at FC Argeș.

Politehnica Timișoara 
He signed a 2-year contract with FC Timișoara on 27 May 2010. He made his debut in a 2–2 draw against Gloria Bistriţa. On 22 September 2010 he scored his first goal for Poli in 3–1 victory in Romanian Cup against Juventus București.

Return to Dinamo 
In January 2012, Tameș returned to Dinamo, signing a contract for six months. At the end of this spell, he is contract was not renewed, the player being released.

International career
Iulian Tameș played 5 friendly games for Romania, making his debut on 16 August 2000 under coach László Bölöni, when he came as a substitute and replaced Constantin Gâlcă in the 75th minute of a 1–1 against Poland. His last appearance for the national team was on 11 February 2009, under coach Victor Pițurcă, when he came as a substitute and replaced Răzvan Cociș in the 81st minute of a 2–1 loss against Croatia.

Honours
Dinamo București
Liga I (3): 2001–02, 2003–04, 2006–07
Cupa României (5): 2000–01, 2002–03, 2003–04, 2004–05, 2011–12
Argeş Piteşti
Liga II (1): 2007–08
Vedița Colonești
Liga III: 2020–21

References

External links

1978 births
Living people
People from Mizil
Romanian footballers
Romanian expatriate footballers
Association football midfielders
FC Dinamo București players
AFC Rocar București players
FC Progresul București players
FC Spartak Vladikavkaz players
FC Argeș Pitești players
FC Politehnica Timișoara players
FC Brașov (1936) players
Romania international footballers
Russian Premier League players
Liga I players
Liga II players
Expatriate footballers in Russia